Pınarbaşı is a Turkish place name and may refer to:

 Pınarbaşı, Acıpayam
 Pınarbaşı, Akseki, a village in Antalya Province
 Pınarbaşı, Bayramiç
 Pınarbaşı, Besni, a village in Adıyaman Province
 Pınarbaşı, Bismil
 Pınarbaşı, Bornova, a neighborhood in Bornova district of Izmir Province, Turkey
 Pınarbaşı, Çelikhan, a village in Adıyaman Province
 Pınarbaşı, Cyprus, a village in northern Cyprus
 Pınarbaşı, Erdemli, a village in Mersin Province
 Pınarbaşı, Ezine, a village in Çanakkale Province, held to be the site of Troy in the 19th century before the excavations at Hisarlik
 Pınarbaşı Gölü, an archaeological site in Turkey in Konya Province
 Pınarbaşı, Gülağaç, a village in Aksaray Province
 Pınarbaşı, Haymana, a village in Ankara Province
 Pınarbaşı, Kaş, a village in Antalya Province
 Pınarbaşı, Kastamonu, a town in Kastamonu Province
 Pınarbaşı District, Kastamonu, a district in Kastamonu Province
 Pınarbaşı, Kayseri,  a district in Kayseri Province
 Pınarbaşı, Kemer
 Pınarbaşı, Mecitözü
 Pınarbaşı, Ortaköy, a village in Aksaray Province